The smallfin gulper shark (Centrophorus moluccensis) is a medium-sized deepwater dogfish in the family Centrophoridae.

Physical characteristics
The smallfin gulper has no anal fin, two dorsal fins with spines, long free rear tips on pectoral fins, and a deeply notched caudal fin. Its maximum length is 98 cm.

Distribution
The smallfin gulper is found in the western Indian Ocean off South Africa and Mozambique, and the western Pacific off Honshū, Japan, Indonesia, New Hebrides, New Caledonia, and southern Australia.

Habits and habitat
Smallfin gulpers are common deepwater sharks. They live near the bottom between 130 and 820 m. They are ovoviviparous and have two pups per litter. Their diets are primarily bony fish, but also other sharks, molluscs, crustaceans, and even tunicates are consumed.

References

smallfin gulper shark
Fish of Japan
Fish of Taiwan
Fish of the Philippines
Fish of Oceania
Marine fauna of Southern Africa
Marine fish of Eastern Australia
Vertebrates of Southern Africa
smallfin gulper shark